Egyptian was launched in 1826 at Quebec. She made a voyage to Mauritius, sailing under a licence from the British East India Company (EIC). She was last listed in 1838.

Career
Egyptian, Friend, master, arrived at Gravesend, Kent from Quebec on 7 December 1826.

Egyptian first appeared in Lloyd's Register (LR), in the volume for 1827.

In 1813 the EIC had lost its monopoly on the trade between India and Britain. British ships were then free to sail to India or the Indian Ocean under a licence from the EIC.

On 3 June 1827 Egyptian , master, sailed from England for Mauritius.

A letter from Elsinore dated 22 November 1831 reported that Egyptian, Spiers, master, had to put into Christiansand leaky, and having lost her rudder. She would have to unload to effect repairs. She had been on her way from Riga to Portsmouth. 

In 1834 Egyptian, Sweetland, master, arrived at Liverpool with a cargo of palm oil, munjeet (Munjeet or Indian madder (Rubia cordifolia), wool, quercitron bark, rosewood, logwood, safflower, fustic, horn tips, and wet ox and cow hides.

Fate
Egyptian was last listed in 1838.

Egyptian, of Liverpool, was wrecked on the Pratas Shoal in 1840. She was on a voyage from Liverpool to China. She had acquired a cargo of opium at Singapore that she was taking to China via Manila.

Citations

References
 

1826 ships
Ships built in Quebec
Age of Sail merchant ships
Merchant ships of the United Kingdom